The Dictabelt, in early years and much less commonly also called a Memobelt, is an analog audio recording medium commercially introduced by the American Dictaphone company in 1947. The belt is loaded onto a pair of metal cylinders, put under tension, then rotated like a tank tread. It is inscribed with an audio-signal-modulated helical groove by a stylus which is slowly moved across the rotating belt. Unlike the stylus of a record cutter, the Dictabelt stylus is blunt and in recording mode it simply impresses a groove into the plastic rather than engraving it and throwing off a thread of waste material. The Dictabelt system was popular, and by 1952, made up 90% of Dictaphone's sales.

Dictabelts were more convenient and provide better audio quality than the reusable wax cylinders they replaced. The belts can be folded for storage and will fit into an ordinary letter-size envelope. However, the plastic loses flexibility as it ages. If a belt is stored sharply folded for a long time, it will become permanently creased and unplayable without special treatment. Dictabelts were red until 1964, blue from 1964 to 1975, then purple until they were discontinued around 1980. Each has a capacity of about 15 minutes at the standard speed. At least one Dictaphone model featured a half-speed, low-fidelity 30-minute option.

In the 1960s, Virginia required that all of its circuit courts be outfitted with Dictabelt machines.

Along with a Gray Audograph sound recorder, a Dictabelt recorded the police department radio channels in Dallas, Texas, during the John F. Kennedy assassination.
These recordings were reviewed by the United States House Select Committee on Assassinations (HSCA).

See also
John F. Kennedy assassination Dictabelt recording

References

External links
Image - History of the Dictation Equipment Industry (archived)
Funny, That Doesn’t Sound Like Me - Article with several images
 Vintage Tech: Dictaphone Dictabelt 800 Record Cutter, databits via YouTube, uploaded on 2 July 2016 

Audiovisual introductions in 1947
Audio storage
1947 in technology
Products introduced in 1947